Clifton E. Gallup (June 17, 1930 – October 9, 1988) was an American guitarist. He was the lead guitarist for the rockabilly group Gene Vincent and the Blue Caps throughout the 1950s.

Biography
In February 1956, local radio DJ Sheriff Tex Davis (William Douchette, 1914–2007) heard Gene Vincent performing at a talent show in Norfolk, Virginia, became his manager, and assembled a band of local musicians to back him. The band included Gallup, who had previously played in a local band, the Virginians, and who was older than Vincent and most of the other band members. In May 1956, the band recorded in Nashville, Tennessee. Producer Ken Nelson had session musicians standing by in case the band was not up to par, but as soon as Gallup played the solos on "Race with the Devil" they knew they would not be needed.

Gallup played on 35 tracks with Vincent, including his biggest hit, "Be-Bop-A-Lula", and established a reputation as one of the most technically proficient guitarists in early rock and roll. As a married man, Gallup was reluctant to tour with Vincent, and left the band in late 1956, returning only for some more studio sessions that same year for the second LP by Vincent and His Blue Caps. In the mid-1960s Gallup made a solo album for the local Pussy Cat record label in Norfolk, Straight Down the Middle, in a more mellow instrumental style akin to that of Chet Atkins and Les Paul. Gallup occasionally played with local bands, while working in school maintenance. He played guitar until the day he died. He last played in Norfolk with a group called the Hi-fi's 48 hours before he suffered a fatal heart attack.

At the time of his death in 1988, he was the director of maintenance and transportation for the Chesapeake, Virginia, city school system, where he worked for almost 30 years.  At the request of his widow, obituaries in local newspapers made no mention of his time with Gene Vincent and His Blue Caps. He is remembered principally for his influence on such guitarists as Eric Clapton, Brian Setzer, and Jeff Beck. The latter recorded an album of Gene Vincent songs, Crazy Legs, in 1993 considered by music critics to be a tribute to Gallup and Vincent.

Gallup was ranked 79th by Rolling Stone magazine's David Fricke in his list of "100 Greatest Guitarists." He was inducted into the Rockabilly Hall of Fame and the Rock and Roll Hall of Fame.

Guitar technique and equipment
His right hand playing technique is based on a flat pick in conjunction with fingerpicks on his middle and ring fingers, using his little finger to work the vibrato bar. In his short time as lead guitarist in Blue Caps he played a 1954 (Vintage Guitar Magazine June 2017) Gretsch 6128 (Duo-Jet) probably fitted up with two DeArmond Dynasonic single coil pickups, an aluminum bridge, not a Melita bridge as previously thought, and a Bigsby vibrato tailpiece. For amplifiers he used a Standel 25L15 (26-Watts tube amp with a single 15-inch speaker) for studio works and a Fender tweed for the remainder. According to one source, Gallup's trademark sound was produced by echo units he constructed himself from old tape recorder parts, but according to another source it was created in the studio by Nelson.

Discography
Tracks recorded with Gene Vincent in chronological order of the recording sessions.

The recording sessions were all done in three series at Bradley Film & Recording Studio, 804 16th Avenue South, Nashville, Tennessee, and produced by Ken Nelson.

A) One session on May 4, 1956

B) Four sessions on June 24–27, 1956

C) Four sessions on October 15–18, 1956

Session 1: May 4, 1956
 Race with the Devil (Gene Vincent, Bill Davis), 2:02
 Be-Bop-A-Lula (Gene Vincent, Bill Davis), 2:35
 Woman Love (Jack Rhodes), 2:31
 I Sure Miss You (Bill Davis, Eddie Bryan), 2:38

Session 2: June 24, 1956 
 Jezebel (Wayne Shanklin), 2:23
 Crazy Legs (Jerry Reed), 2:09
 Peg o' My Heart (Fred Fisher, Alfred Bryan), 2:35
 Wedding Bells (Are Breaking Up That Old Gang of Mine) (Sammy Fain, Irving Kahal, Willie Raskin), 2:30

Session 3: June 25, 1956
 Waltz of the Wind (Fred Rose), 2:42
 Up a Lazy River (Hoagy Carmichael, Sidney Arodin), 2:20
 Ain't She Sweet (Milton Ager, Jack Yellin), 2:29
 Gonna Back Up Baby (Danny Wolfe), 2:24
 Race with the Devil (Gene Vincent, Bill Davis), unissued / lost track

Session 4: June 26, 1956
 Who Slapped John (Gene Vincent, Bill Davis), 1:56
 Jumps Giggles and Shout (Gene Vincent, Bill Davis), 2:50
 Bluejean Bop (Gene Vincent, Hal Levy), 2:21
 I Flipped (Bobbie Carrol, Bill Hicks), 2:24

Session 5: June 27, 1956
 Bop Street (Cliff Gallup, Bill Davis), 2:24
 Well, I Knocked Bim Bam (Bobbie Carrol), 2:14
 You Told a Fib (Cliff Gallup, Gene Vincent), 2:20
 Jump Back, Honey, Jump Back (Hadda Brooks), 2:00

Session 6: October 15, 1956
 Teenage Partner (version 1) (Gene Vincent, Bill Davis), 2:13
 Blues Stay Away from Me (Alton & Rabon Delmore, Wayne Raney, P. Henry Glover), 2:16
 Five Feet of Lovin (version 1) (Buck Peddy, Mel Tillis), 2:07
 Cat Man (Gene Vincent, Bill Davis), 2:18Session 7: October 16, 1956 Double Talkin' Baby (Danny Wolfe), 2:12
 Hold Me, Hug Me, Rock Me (Gene Vincent, Bill Davis), 2:14
 Unchained Melody (Alex North, Hy Zaret), 2:37Session 8: October 17, 1956'''
 B-I-Bickey-Bi Bo Bo Go (Don Carter, Dub Nalls, Jack Rhodes), 2:15
 Pink Thunderbird (Paul Peek, Bill Davis), 2:32
 Pretty, Pretty Baby (Danny Wolfe), 2:27
 Cruisin (Gene Vincent, Bill Davis), 2:11Session 9: October 18, 1956 Important Words (version 1) (Gene Vincent, Bill Davis), 2:21
 You Better Believe (Cliff Gallup), 1:59
 Red Bluejeans and a Pony Tail (Jack Rhodes, Bill Davis), 2:14
 Five Days, Five Days (Jack Rhodes, Billy Willey, Freddie Franks), 2:36Solo album'Straight Down the Middle'' (mid-1960s, Pussy Cat label; recorded as "The Four C's featuring Gallopin' Cliff Gallup"[]).

References

American rock guitarists
American male guitarists
1930 births
1988 deaths
20th-century American guitarists
20th-century American male musicians